This is a list of major sports controversies in Australia or concerning Australian sportspeople. These controversies cover areas such as rules, match fixing, cheating, sportsmanship, doping and sport administration. They have generated large scale media coverage over a period of time and may have resulted in a large scale inquiry. These controversies affect the integrity of sport.

See also
Drugs in sport in Australia
:Category:Australian sportspeople in doping cases
Racism in sport in Australia
Sport in Australia
Rugby union and apartheid
National Rugby League salary cap breaches

References

 
Sports
Australia sport-related lists
History of sport in Australia